Kazakhstan participated at the 2018 Asian Para Games which was held in Jakarta, Indonesia from 6 to 13 October 2018. The Kazakhstani delegation was composed of 90 athletes who competed in nine sports, namely: table tennis, para judo, para swimming, shooting para sports, para powerlifting, archery, chess, para athletics and sitting volleyball.

Medalists

Medals by sport

Medals by day

See also
 Kazakhstan at the 2018 Asian Games

References

Nations at the 2018 Asian Para Games
2018 in Kazakhstani sport